José Isaza (born 1 June 1972) is a Panamanian swimmer. He competed in three events at the 1996 Summer Olympics.

References

1972 births
Living people
Panamanian male swimmers
Olympic swimmers of Panama
Swimmers at the 1996 Summer Olympics
Place of birth missing (living people)